Parliamentary elections were held in the Federated States of Micronesia on 5 March 1985. All candidates for seats in Congress ran as independents.

References

Micronesia
1985 in the Federated States of Micronesia
Elections in the Federated States of Micronesia
Non-partisan elections